Josef "Pepi" Humpál (30 January 1918 – 19 December 1984) was a footballer and football manager from Czechoslovakia.

He played for SK Baťa Zlín, FC Sochaux-Montbéliard, SO Montpellier, RC Strasbourg and AS Béziers.
He coached SO Montpellier, RC Strasbourg, AS Béziers in France and Cantonal Neuchâtel FC, FC Xamax-Sports, FC Yverdon-Sports and FC Fribourg in Switzerland. He is the first ever foreigner to score a hat-trick in Ligue 1.

References

External links
 Profile

1918 births
1984 deaths
Sportspeople from Olomouc
Czechoslovak footballers
Czech footballers
Czechoslovak expatriate footballers
FC Fastav Zlín players
Expatriate footballers in France
FC Sochaux-Montbéliard players
Montpellier HSC players
RC Strasbourg Alsace players
Ligue 1 players
Ligue 2 players
Czechoslovak football managers
Czech football managers
Montpellier HSC managers
RC Strasbourg Alsace managers
Neuchâtel Xamax FCS managers
AS Béziers Hérault (football) managers
AS Béziers Hérault (football) players
Czechoslovak expatriate sportspeople in France
Czechoslovak expatriate sportspeople in Switzerland
Yverdon-Sport FC managers
Association football forwards
FC Fribourg managers